Donald Raeburn Algernon Gehrs (29 November 1880 – 25 June 1953) was an Australian sportsman who played six Test matches for Australia from 1904 to 1911 and played Australian rules football for South Adelaide and North Adelaide Football Clubs.

Described as "Tall, thickset and athletic", Gehrs played 13 games of football for South Adelaide in 1902 and seven games for North Adelaide in 1908.

An aggressive opening batsman who liked to take on the fast bowlers, Gehrs played Sheffield Shield cricket for South Australia from 1902–03 to 1920–21. In a first-class match against Western Australia in February 1906, he carried his bat for 148 not out in the first innings (of a team total of 235) and made 100 not out in the second innings. His highest score was 170, when South Australia defeated Victoria by an innings at the Melbourne Cricket Ground in 1904–05. In 1912-13 he scored 119 in 60 minutes against Western Australia in Adelaide.

He toured New Zealand in 1904-05 and England in 1905 with the Australian team. His highest Test score was 67 against South Africa at the Sydney Cricket Ground in 1910–11, when he added 144 for the third wicket with Clem Hill.

Gehrs was also a professional sprinter, who finished third in the Stawell Gift in 1904.

Gehrs gained a diploma in mechanical engineering at the South Australian School of Mines in 1900. He worked for the firm of Poynton and Claxton, land agents, for many years and later became a land agent on his own account. He died in 1953, survived by his wife Olive (née Edwards).

References

External links
 

1880 births
1953 deaths
University of South Australia alumni
Australia Test cricketers
South Australia cricketers
Australian cricketers
Cricketers from South Australia
Australian rules footballers from South Australia
South Adelaide Football Club players
North Adelaide Football Club players